The 2021 Shanghai Dragons season was the fourth season of the Shanghai Dragons's existence in the Overwatch League and their second under head coach Moon Byung-chul.

Preceding offseason

Roster changes 

The Dragons entered free agency with five free agents.

Acquisitions 

The Dragons's first offseason acquisition was Koo "Fate" Pan-seung, a veteran tank player, who was acquired from the Florida Mayhem on November 11, 2020. Six days later, the Dragons signed Jeong "Erster" Jun, a "generally adaptable" damage player who played with the Atlanta Reign in 2020. Shanghai's final acquisition of the offseason was He "Molly" Chengzhi, a support formerly with the Chengdu Hunters who was signed on November 24.

Departures 

Four of the Dragons' five free agents did not return, none of which were signed with other teams, which included damage player Yang "Dding" Jin-hyeok, damage player Lu "Diya" Weida, tank player Kim "Geguri" Se-yeon, and support player Yang "Luffy" Sung-hyeon. Outside of their free agents, the Dragons' first departure was tank player Lee "Fearless" Eui-seok, who was transferred to the Dallas Fuel on November 7. Twenty days later, on November 27, the Dragons released tank player Seo "Stand1" Ji-won.

Regular season 

The Dragons' first match of the 2021 season resulted in a win over the Guangzhou Charge in the May Melee qualifiers. After defeating the Philadelphia Fusion in the Eastern regional knockouts, the Dragons entered the May Melee tournament, the first of four midseason double-elimination tournaments in the regular season, as the second-seeded Eastern team. The team fell to the Dallas Fuel in the upper bracket finals, dropping them to the lower bracket of the tournament; the Dragons reached the finals of the tournament through the lower bracket, where they once again lost to the Fuel.

Prior to the start of the June Joust qualifiers, damage player Joon "Erster" Jeong retired. Looking to add depth to their roster, the Dragons signed damage player Lee "WhoRU" Seung-jun several days later. The team won three of their four June Joust qualifying matches to advance them to the regional knockouts. Several days before the knockouts began, the Dragons lost another player to retirement in damage player Bae "Diem" Min-seong; once again looking for depth, the team signed damage player Chae "Develop" Rak-hoon shortly afterwards. The Dragons advanced to the June Joust tournament after defeating the Seoul Dynasty in the regional knockouts. The team lost their first match of the tournament, again to the Fuel; however, after making it to the finals through the lower bracket, the Dragons defeated the Fuel to claim their first title of the 2021 season.

The Dragons continued their success throughout the Summer Showdown, winning all four of their qualifying matches and advancing past the regional qualifiers. Prior to the start of the Summer Showdown tournament, the team added former Dragons player Kim "Daemin" Dae-min as a coach. The Dragons went undefeated in the tournament, and after defeating the Chengdu Hunters in the finals, they claimed their second consecutive midseason tournament title.

In the final tournament cycle of the regular season, the Countdown Cup, the Dragons went 2–2 in the qualifiers, failing to advance to the regional knockouts for the first time in the season; Dragons' head coach Moon "Moon" Byung-chul stated that they were "resting" their players during the tournament cycle. The team finished the regular season with 12 wins, 4 losses, 20 league points, and the top seed in the season playoffs.

Kim "Fleta" Byung-sun, Lee "Lip" Jae-won, and Kim "Izayaki" Min-chul were all MVP candidates for the 2021 regular season. Additionally, Lee "Lip" Jae-won, Kang "Void" Jung-woo, Kim "Izayaki" Min-chul, and Lee "Leejaegon" Jae-gon were awarded Role Star commendations for damage, tank, support, and support, respectively.

Playoffs 

Shanghai selected the sixth-seeded San Francisco Shock as their opponent for the first round of the season playoffs; the Dragons swept the Shock, 3–0. The team next defeated the fourth-seeded Los Angeles Gladiators by a score of 3–1. Moving on to the upper bracket finals, the Dragons faced the second-seeded Dallas Fuel, marking the fifth time the two teams had played each other in a midseason or season playoff match in the 2021 season. Despite keeping the maps close, the Dragons came out with a 3–1 victory to advance the Grand Finals bracket.

In the Grand Finals match, the Dragons swept the Reign by a score of 4–0 to win their first OWL championship.

Final roster

Transactions 
Transactions of/for players on the roster during the 2021 regular season:
On May 21, damage player Jeong "Erster" Joon retired.
On May 25, the Dragons signed damage player Lee "WhoRU" Seung-jun.
On June 3, damage player Bae "diem" Min-seong retired.
On June 10, the Dragon signed damage player Chae "Develop" Rak-hoon.

Standings

Game log

Regular season 

|2021 season schedule

Postseason

References 

Shanghai Dragons
Shanghai Dragons
Shanghai Dragons seasons